Martin Doyle (born 16 November 1958) is an Irish wrestler. He competed in the men's freestyle 82 kg at the 1988 Summer Olympics, representing Great Britain.

References

External links
 

1958 births
Living people
Irish male sport wrestlers
Olympic wrestlers of Great Britain
Wrestlers at the 1988 Summer Olympics
Sportspeople from Dublin (city)
20th-century Irish people